Brams is a surname. Notable people with the surname include:

 Steven Brams (born 1940), American game theorist and political scientist
 Ingeborg Brams (1921–1989), Danish film, radio, television, and theatre actress

See also
 Brahms (surname)
 Bram (disambiguation)